Clandestino is a 1998 album by Manu Chao.

Clandestino(s) may also refer to:

 "Clandestino" (Manu Chao song), 1998
 "Clandestino" (Shakira and Maluma song), 2018
 Clandestino, a 2016 album by Lartiste
 "Clandestino", a 2014 song by Francesco Gabbani from Greitist Iz
 Clandestinos (1987 film), a 1987 Cuban film directed by Fernando Pérez
 Clandestinos (2007 film), a 2007 Spanish film directed by Antonio Hens